The list of ship launches in 1763 includes a chronological list of some ships launched in 1763.


References

1763
Ship launches